Hans Nowak (9 August 1937 – 19 July 2012) was a German football player. He played in four matches at the 1962 FIFA World Cup.

Club career 
Nowak was born in Gelsenkirchen, Germany.  While playing for FC Bayern Munich, he won the Cup Winners' Cup in 1967.

International career 
Nowak became notable for being the first attacking full-back in German football. Between September 1961 and November 1964, Nowak was the standard right back of West Germany, starting in 15 out of 20 international games during that period. He didn't score during this period.

Career after pro times 
After retiring in 1971, Nowak coached FC Hochstadt and FC Herzogenaurach. He later worked for Puma AG in Herzogenaurach, becoming director of public relations there. After leaving Puma AG in 1991, he worked for FC Bayern Munich, organising the sales of merchandising.

References

External links
 
 
 
 

1937 births
2012 deaths
Sportspeople from Gelsenkirchen
German footballers
Germany international footballers
FC Schalke 04 players
FC Bayern Munich footballers
FC Bayern Munich non-playing staff
Kickers Offenbach players
Bundesliga players
1962 FIFA World Cup players
People from the Province of Westphalia
Association football defenders
Footballers from North Rhine-Westphalia
West German footballers